Yendrembam Denechandra Meitei (born 28 March 1994) is an Indian professional footballer who plays as a defender for Indian Super League club Odisha, on loan from Kerala Blasters.

Club career

Early career
Born in Manipur, Meitei started playing football from the age of 10 years. He initially trained at a local stadium to improve his technical ability. He eventually managed to make it into his district team and then the Manipur football team in the youth nationals. Then in 2008 he was signed by Mohun Bagan A.C. to join their academy. After a one-year stay at the academy, Meitei joined the Sambhalpur Academy in Orissa. However, due to problems with both academies in terms of how they taught academics, Meitei dropped out of both. He then went back to Manipur to play for a local club.

Then, after going back to Manipur, James Singh of Mumbai F.C. recommended Meitei to trial at Pune F.C. for a spot in the Pune F.C. Academy. Meitei trialed for the spot in the academy and passed. While with the Pune F.C. Academy Meitei had won the I-League U19 twice.

Pune Football Club
On 10 October 2013, Meitei made his professional debut for Pune F.C. in the I-League against Mohun Bagan A.C. at the Balewadi Sports Complex in which he came on in the 89th minute for Pierre Douhou as Pune won the match 2–0.

Kerala Blasters
On 5 August 2020, it was announced that Meitei would join Kerala Blasters from TRAU FC. He made his first appearance for the club on 29 November 2021, against Chennaiyin FC. On 6 May 2021, Metei signed a new three-year contract with Kerala Blasters, keeping him at the club until 2024.

Meitei was included in the Kerala Blasters squad for the 2021 Durand Cup, and played his first match against arch-rivals Bengaluru FC on 15 September, where he received a red card and the match ended in a 2–0 defeat for the Blasters. He played his first match of the 2021–22 Indian Super League season as a substitute for Nishu Kumar against Bengaluru itself in the 88th minute of the, which they lost 0–1.

Odisha FC (loan)
On 6 July 2022, Odisha FC announced the signing of Meitei on a season long loan deal from the Blasters.

International career
Meitei has represented India at the under-23 level in which he played for them in a tournament held at Bangladesh.

Career statistics

Club

Honours

Club

Kerala Blasters FC 

 Indian Super League runner up: 2021–22.

References

External links 
 

1994 births
Living people
Indian footballers
Pune FC players
TRAU FC players
Association football fullbacks
Footballers from Manipur
I-League players
Kerala Blasters FC players
Mohun Bagan AC players
Churchill Brothers FC Goa players
NEROCA FC players
Indian Super League players